Turburea is a commune in Gorj County, Oltenia, Romania. It is composed of five villages: Cocorova, Poiana, Spahii, Șipotu and Turburea.

Constantina Diță-Tomescu was born there.

References

Communes in Gorj County
Localities in Oltenia